Barbara Johnson (born 5 December 1962) is an Irish hurdler. She competed in the women's 400 metres hurdles at the 1988 Summer Olympics.

References

1962 births
Living people
Athletes (track and field) at the 1988 Summer Olympics
Irish female hurdlers
Olympic athletes of Ireland
World Athletics Championships athletes for Ireland
Place of birth missing (living people)